Joel Filipe Sousa Monteiro (born 1 May 1991 in Porto) is a Portuguese footballer who plays for Casa Pia AC, as a defender.

Football career
On 26 August 2015, Monteiro made his professional debut with Famalicão in a 2015–16 Segunda Liga match against Vitória Guimarães B.

References

External links
 
 Stats and profile at LPFP 
 

1991 births
Living people
Portuguese footballers
Association football defenders
Liga Portugal 2 players
F.C. Famalicão players
Casa Pia A.C. players
Footballers from Porto